The American Can Company of Utah Building Complex, now known as the AmeriCan Center, is a historic industrial site located in Ogden City, Utah. It was built in 1914 by the American Can Company. By the late 1940s, the plant employed 450 people and produced millions of cans for pea, potato, green bean and fruit crop farmers in Weber County. For a while, the company also manufactured steel beer cans. The company switched to making steel soft drink cans in the 1950s, but closed in 1979 with the advent of aluminum cans.

It was added to the National Register of Historic Places in 2005. It has since been converted to commercial space consisting of the U.S. headquarters of Amer Sports and the DaVinci Academy of Science and the Arts.

See also
National Register of Historic Places listings in Weber County, Utah

References

External links
Utah's Canning Industry

Buildings designated early commercial in the National Register of Historic Places
Industrial buildings completed in 1914
Buildings and structures in Ogden, Utah
Industrial buildings and structures on the National Register of Historic Places in Utah
Utah Building Complex
National Register of Historic Places in Weber County, Utah